Bartłomiej Bartosiak (born 26 February 1991) is a Polish professional footballer who plays as a midfielder for IV liga club GKS Bełchatów.

Career

Club
In August 2011, he was loaned to Olimpia Elbląg on a half-year deal.

On 1 July 2020, he signed with fourth-tier club Wisła Puławy.

On 25 July 2022, he returned to GKS Bełchatów following the club's demotion from II liga to IV liga.

References

External links
 
 

1991 births
Sportspeople from Bełchatów
Living people
Polish footballers
Association football midfielders
GKS Bełchatów players
Olimpia Elbląg players
Stal Stalowa Wola players
Wisła Puławy players
Ekstraklasa players
I liga players
II liga players
III liga players